William Jennings Bryan Harriss (December 11, 1897 – September 19, 1963) was an American professional baseball pitcher. He played in Major League Baseball (MLB) between the 1920 and 1928 seasons for the Philadelphia Athletics and Boston Red Sox. A native of Brownwood, Texas, he studied at Howard Payne University.

A tall, lanky hurler, Harriss entered the majors in 1920 with the Philadelphia Athletics, playing for them six and a half years before joining the Boston Red Sox (1926–28). Twice he led the American League in losses, with 20 in 1922 and 21 in 1927. His most productive season came with the 1925 Athletics, when he recorded career-highs with 19 wins, a 3.49 ERA, and  innings pitched. During the 1926 midseason, he was sent by the Athletics along Fred Heimach and Baby Doll Jacobson to the Red Sox in the same transaction that brought Tom Jenkins and Howard Ehmke to Philadelphia. That year he became the last pitcher (through the end of the 2019 season) to throw more than 150 innings in a season without allowing a single home run.  In 1928, he led the hapless pitching staff of Boston with 14 wins and 77 strikeouts.

In a nine-season career, Harriss posted a 95–135 record with 644 strikeouts and a 4.26 ERA in 349 appearances, including 228 starts, 89 complete games, seven shutouts, 78 games finished, 16 saves, and  innings of work.

Harriss died in Temple, Texas at age 65.

References

Sources
Baseball Reference
Retrosheet

Boston Red Sox players
Philadelphia Athletics players
Major League Baseball pitchers
Howard Payne Yellow Jackets baseball players
Baseball players from Texas
1897 births
1963 deaths
People from Brownwood, Texas